Éterpigny is a commune in the Pas-de-Calais department in the Hauts-de-France region of France.

Its inhabitants are called Sterpiniens and Sterpiniennes.

Geography
The A26 autoroute passes by about half a mile from the village.

Population

Places of interest
 The church of St.Martin, rebuilt, as was the rest of the village, after World War I.
 The Commonwealth War Graves Commission cemetery.

See also
Communes of the Pas-de-Calais department

References

External links

 The CWGC cemetery at Éterpigny

Communes of Pas-de-Calais